William Eckersley (16 July 1925 – 25 October 1982) was an English footballer. He played as a fullback, spending his entire playing career at Blackburn Rovers.

Football career
Eckersley was born at Southport and after finishing school worked as a lorry driver. He was playing amateur football for High Park in 1947 when he was recommended to Blackburn Rovers  by High Parker, Johnny Fairhurst, who signed for Blackburn Rovers himself in 1938.

Although he retained his driving job, he signed as an amateur for Rovers later that month. He initially played in Rovers' reserves where his form was sufficiently good for him to be offered professional terms in March 1948.

He made his Football League debut in the final match of the 1947–48 season, with Blackburn already doomed to relegation. Although Blackburn were to spend the next ten seasons in the Second Division, Eckersley's consistent performances led to him being considered one of the best full-backs in the country, and despite not having made an international appearance he was taken with the England squad to the 1950 World Cup finals in Brazil, collecting his first cap in the final match against Spain. Having lost to America, England needed to win this match to stay in the World Cup. Spain took the lead through centre-forward Telmo Zarra in the forty-seventh minute and then dropped back into deep defence. Even with Stanley Matthews and Tom Finney operating, England could not make the breakthrough and their World Cup challenge was over. This was however the start of an international full-back pairing with Alf Ramsey, with the pair making fifteen appearances together.

As Blackburn continued in their attempts to return to the First Division, Eckersley continued to give good service to both club and country, collecting a total of 17 caps, as well as three "B" caps and representing the Football League on six occasions. His final England appearance came on 25 November 1953 in a friendly against Hungary. England lost the match 6–3, with Ferenc Puskás scoring twice and Nándor Hidegkuti converting a hat trick. This was England's second defeat by foreign opponents on home territory after Ireland, and the match changed the face of English football. As well as Eckersley, several other England players were never to represent their country, including Ramsey and Stan Mortensen.
 
Eckersley had the ability to dribble all the way up to the opposition penalty area. With superb ball control, he was able to let a player pass him; he would then extend his left leg behind the opponent and nick the ball away without fouling the opposing player, thus earning him the "telescopic leg" tag.

Blackburn finally returned to the First Division in 1958, enabling Eckersley to play one complete season in the top flight, although his better days were behind him. Although the club reached the final of the FA Cup in 1960, Eckersley was not selected for the final, with Dave Whelan being preferred.

The following season, his career was ended by injury after over 430 first-team appearances for Blackburn, with 21 goals (of which 18 came from the penalty spot).

Later career
Following his retirement, a testimonial match was held at Ewood Park on 24 April 1961 which was attended by a crowd of 21,000.

He later ran a confectionery business and after this failed he worked as a taxi driver before returning to his first career as a lorry driver.

He died in October 1982 aged 57 and his ashes were scattered around the pitch of Ewood Park by his sons prior to a match.

International appearances
Eckersley made 17 appearances for England in official international matches, as follows:

References

1925 births
1982 deaths
English footballers
England international footballers
1950 FIFA World Cup players
Blackburn Rovers F.C. players
Footballers from Southport
English Football League players
England B international footballers
English Football League representative players
Association football fullbacks
British taxi drivers